Microstoma floccosum is a species in the cup fungus family Sarcoscyphaceae. It is recognizable by its deep funnel-shaped, scarlet-colored fruit bodies bearing white hairs on the exterior. Found in the United States and Asia, it grows on partially buried sticks and twigs of oak trees.

Description
Both the interior and exterior surfaces of the cup are scarlet red. The exterior surface is covered with stiff white hairs. Details of the hair structure may be seen with a magnifying glass: they are up to 1 mm long or more, translucent, thick-walled, rigid and more or less sword-shaped with simple, sharply diminishing bases. They are connected to the fruit body at the junction of internal tissue layers called the medullary and ectal excipulums. When the hairs come in contact with an alkali solution of 2% potassium hydroxide, the thick walls of the base of the hair first swell in size and then dissolve, releasing the contents of the internal lumen.

The species is inedible.

Microscopic characteristics
The spores are 20–30 by 14–16 µm; the asci (spore-bearing cells) are 300–350 by 18–20 µm. The paraphyses (sterile, upright, basally attached filaments in the hymenium, growing between asci) are thin, slightly thickened at the tip and contain many red granules.

Varieties
One variant species has been described, M. floccosum var. floccosum, found in China and Japan, has larger spores than typical. The fungus originally described as Microstoma floccosum var. macrosporum was recognized as an independent species in 2000 and renamed to Macrostoma macrosporum. It differs from M. floccosum by fruiting season, asci and ascospore size, and the ultrastructure of the hairs.

Similar species
Microstoma apiculosporum is a species from Taiwan that has spores with short, sharply pointed tips. Scutellinia scutellata has a shallow red cup, no stalk, and black hairs on only the edge of the cap margin. The stalked scarlet cup, Sarcoscypha occidentalis, has a shape, size and color that somewhat resemble M. floccosum, but it lacks any surface hairs, and the cup is not as deep.

Habitat and distribution
A saprobic species, Microstoma floccosum grows scattered to clustered together, attached to wood that is typically partially buried in the earth. A preference for both oak and Shagbark hickory has been noted.

Microstoma floccosum has been collected from the United States, India, China, and Japan.

References

Sarcoscyphaceae
Fungi described in 1832
Fungi of Asia
Fungi of the United States
Inedible fungi
Fungi without expected TNC conservation status